CUS Perugia Rugby is an Italian professional rugby union team based in Perugia, which competes in the Serie A.

Perugia was founded in 1969.

Stadium 
The team plays at the Campo da Rugby in Perugia.

Former players 
 Franco Lamanna

Former coaches 
 Petrică Motrescu (1989-1990)

External links
 Official site

Rugby clubs established in 1969
Italian rugby union teams
Serie A (rugby union) teams
Perugia